Love is Sweet, is a 2020 Chinese television series loosely adapted from the novel of the same name by Qizi. Starring Luo Yunxi and Bai Lu as leads, the show started airing with multi-languages subtitles on iQIYI on Sep 27, 2020.

Synopsis   

Jiang Jun, with her double master's degree in Economics and Psychology, applies for a job at an investment bank called MH, where Yuan Shuai, once the alleged 'big bully' of her childhood, now MH's executive director, goes out of his way to prevent her from entering the company. However, she finally gets into MH with Lin Taimo's help. It is revealed that Yuan Shuai has been in love with Jiang Jun for 10 years and that he has always 'bullied' her to toughen her up so that she would not cry so easily when faced with difficulties because she has tear allergy. When he confesses, Jiang Jun reciprocates his feelings, and they start dating. When Lin Taimo is appointed as MH's managing director, he sets Yuan Shuai up in a bribery scheme and successfully kicks him out of MH, replacing him with Du Lei, Yuan Shuai's longtime rival in the investment banking field. With Linda and Du Lei's help, Yuan Shuai secretly investigates the acquisition of the rice noodle company of Jiang Jun's deceased father and his associated death, whose culprits turn out to be Lin Taimo and Linda. Yuan Shuai's cousin Li Xiaochuan and Jiang Jun's best friend Xu Li also start a relationship after Xu Li has been pursuing him and helping him with his newly founded start-up.

Two years later, Jiang Jun is promoted to be vice president of the investment bank department, while Yuan Shai is the managing director of GE's corresponding department. Du Lei, now MH's investment bank department managing director, confesses his feelings to Jiang Jun only to face rejection. Jiang Jun investigates Du Lei's corruption act because it causes two of her colleagues to be fired by Du Lei. Yuan Shai finally successfully proposes after several failed attempts, to which Jiang Jun accepts and then gets pregnant with their first child.

Cast 
 Luo Yunxi as Yuan Shuai (27 years old)
 A MH executive director, MH's undefeated God of War. A wolf in the investment banking world who acts decisively and works efficiently. He's been secretly in love with Jiang Jun for 10 years, but was always too afraid to confess. He has always played jokes and scared her since young to try to help Jiang Jun cultivate a tougher personality due to her allergy, but is misunderstood as a bully. Yuan Shuai has the ability to easily switch between a tough  professional and a cute boyfriend. Hidden weakness: Jiang Jun.
Bai Lu as Jiang Jun (25 years old)
 A MH Securities Analyst, later Vice President, Soft on the outside but strong on the inside. She is allergic to tears, hence extremely tolerant of stress. She has known Yuan Shuai as a childhood friend since kindergarten, and always seen him as a bully. A queen at work and a cute girl in private who can easily make Yuan Shuai jealous. Hidden weakness: allergy to tears.
 Gao Hanyu as Du Lei (30 years old)
 A GE Executive Director, Yuan Shuai's rival who has always lost out to the former, whether in investment banking, car racing or love. Du Lei hides a scarred past, and is willing to do anything to achieve his goals. He is not one to readily reveal his true feelings to anybody, and has never once lived for himself. Hidden weakness: Unknown
 Xiao Yan as Xu Li (25 years old)
 A Convenience store worker, Jiang Jun's best friend. She has a strong sense of justice, prioritises love above everything else and has no career ambitions. Xu Li has an obvious crush on Li Xiaochuan, and does everything she can to help him reach his dreams.
 Riley Wang as Li Xiao Chuan (25 years old)
 A West World app developer, Yuan Shuai's younger cousin. An IT genius who is serious, hardworking and dedicates his life to coding. He has no interest in anything else, and is extremely obtuse when it comes to other people's feelings. Hidden weakness: secret video on Yuan Shuai's phone.
 Zhao Yuanyuan as Qiao Na
 A MH Vice President, MH female God of War who pursues perfection and is extremely demanding on subordinates. She likes and boldly pursues Yuan Shuai, but never forces Yuan Shuai to reciprocate her feelings. Hidden weakness: emotional pain cannot occur at the same time as career problems.
 An Weiling as Linda
 A GE Executive Director, One of the founding members of MH who eventually left and joined GE. Du Lei's adoptive sister and a woman who prioritises her own interests above everything else. Hidden weakness: serious insomnia 
 Guan Zijing as Su Chang
 Yuan Shuai's wingman, He helps Yuan Shuai collect information using his large range of contacts. Hidden weakness: his girlfriend Xin Xin

References

External links 
Love is Sweet-Sina Weibo
Love is Sweet-iQIYI

Chinese drama television series
2020 Chinese television series debuts
Television shows based on Chinese novels
Workplace drama television series
2020s workplace drama television series